The Karaite Synagogue (Hebrew: בית הכנסת הקראי באיסטנבול) is a Kenesa in the Hasköy district of Beyoğlu, Istanbul, Turkey. The building's date of construction is unclear; it may date to Byzantine times. The building was in ruins in the sixteenth century; it was repaired in 1536, burned in 1729, rebuilt, burned again in 1774, rebuilt between 1776 and 1780, restored in 1842, and burned again in 1918. The Karaite congregation of the town also has their own cemetery. The trust behind these Institutions is called Hasköy Türk Karaim Musevi Sinagogu Vakfı. Today the Kenesa functions only at the Karaite Pesach. Contact to the congregation can be built via the Turkish Chief Rabbinate or the 
Quincentennial Foundation Museum of Turkish Jews.

See also
Constantinopolitan Karaites
History of the Jews in Turkey
Karaite Judaism
List of synagogues in Turkey

References

External links
Center for Jewish History Digital Collections, Turkish Synagogues Exhibit. Karaite Synagogue in Hasköy, Istanbul, Exterior (One of several photographs of the Karaite Synagogue in the Turkish Synagogues Exhibit.)
Center for Jewish History Digital Collections. Karaite Synagogue in Hasköy, Istanbul

Synagogues in Istanbul
Golden Horn
Karaite synagogues
Romaniote synagogues